The 1870s (pronounced "eighteen-seventies") was a decade of the Gregorian calendar that began on January 1, 1870, and ended on December 31, 1879.

The trends of the previous decade continued into this one, as new empires, imperialism and militarism rose in Europe and Asia. The United States was recovering from the American Civil War, though the Reconstruction era introduced its own legacies of bitterness and racial segregation in the country. Germany unified as a nation in 1871 and became the German Empire. Changing social conditions led workforces to cooperate in the form of labor unions in order to demand better pay and working conditions, with strikes occurring worldwide in the later part of the decade and continuing until World War I. The decade was also a period of significant technological advancement; the phonograph, telephone, and electric light bulb were all invented during the 1870s, though it would take several more decades before they became household items.

Politics and wars

Wars
Dungan Revolt (1862–1877), Hui uprising against the Qing Empire which resulted in 20 million deaths and a Qing victory
Franco-Prussian War (1870–1871), resulted in the collapse of the Second French Empire and in the formation of both the French Third Republic and the German Empire
Third Anglo-Ashanti War, also known as the "First Ashanti Expedition" (1873–1874), ended with the destruction of the royal palace at Kumasi and the signing of the Treaty of Fomena, which secured British trading rights in the area
The Third Carlist War (1872–1876), the last of the Carlist Wars in Spain
Ethiopian–Egyptian War (1874–1876), a resource conflict over access to the Nile River basin between the Ethiopian Empire and the Khedivate of Egypt, resulting in an Ethiopian victory
Russo-Turkish War (1877–1878), resulted in Serbia, Romania, and Montenegro becoming completely independent from the Ottoman Empire, while Bulgaria became autonomous
In the United States, post-Civil War Reconstruction continued until its conclusion under President Rutherford B. Hayes in 1877
Second Anglo-Afghan War (1878–1880), fought between the British Raj and the Emirate of Afghanistan
Anglo-Zulu War (11 January – 5 July 1879)
War of the Pacific (1879–1884), fought over resource-rich territory along the Pacific coast between Chile and an alliance of Bolivia and Peru

Colonization, decolonization, and independence
The British Empire continued to grow, with the 1870s marking the beginning of the New Imperialism.
Bulgaria and Romania declared independence following a war against the Ottoman Empire.
The Sioux battled the United States Cavalry and resisted encroachment by white settlers on the Great Plains.
Passive resistance was used to prevent the confiscation of Māori land at Parihaka in New Zealand.

Political and social events
The German Empire and Alliance System emerged.
Racial and economic politics at the height of America's Reconstruction Era were bitter, pessimistic, and sometimes violent.
The Gilded Age began in 1877, lasting until 1896.
The First Spanish Republic rises and promptly ends (1873–1874). 
The first Ottoman Constitution is promulgated in 1876, starting the First Constitutional Era (1876–1878).
Contested US presidential election of 1876

Science and technology

 The prototype telephone was invented by Alexander Graham Bell in 1876.
 The phonograph is invented in 1877 by Thomas Edison.
 The 6.35mm headphone jack was invented in 1878 and is still widely used today.
 The first version of the light bulb was invented by Thomas Edison in 1879.
 The steam drill is invented in 1879.
 Ludwig Boltzmann statistically defined thermodynamic entropy. 
 1873 Weltausstellung in Vienna, 1876 Centennial Exposition in Philadelphia and 1878 Exposition universelle in Paris.

Environment
 Atlas bear became extinct in 1870.
 Yellowstone National Park was established and signed into law in 1872.

Popular culture

Literature and arts
 Jules Verne (France) publishes Around The World in Eighty Days.
 Monet, Renoir, Pissarro, and Sisley organized the Société Anonyme Coopérative des Artistes Peintres, Sculpteurs, Graveurs ("Cooperative and Anonymous Association of Painters, Sculptors, and Engravers") for the purpose of exhibiting their artworks independently. Members of the association, which soon included Cézanne, Berthe Morisot, and Edgar Degas, were expected to forswear participation in the Salon. The organizers invited a number of other progressive artists to join them in their inaugural exhibition, including the slightly older Eugène Boudin, whose example had first persuaded Monet to take up plein air painting years before. Another painter who greatly influenced Monet and his friends, Johan Jongkind, declined to participate, as did Manet. In total, thirty artists participated in their first exhibition, held in April 1874 at the studio of the photographer Nadar. The group soon became known as the Impressionists.
 Jeanne Calment, born 1875, would eventually become the longest-living human being with a verified lifespan. She lived until 1997, at the age of 122. She still holds the record as of 2023.
Lewis Carroll publishes Through the Looking-Glass.
Mark Twain publishes ‘’The Adventures of Tom Sawyer’’ in 1876.
Henrik Ibsen releases A Doll's House in 1879.

Fashion

People

Politics
 Eugène Borel, Director Universal Postal Union
Rutherford B Hayes, Elected US President in disputed election of 1876
Thomas W Ferry, Served as Senate Pro tempore and acting US Vice President during 1870s
 Gustave Moynier, President International Committee of the Red Cross
Samuel Tilden, won popular vote but lost contested election in 1876 US presidential election

Famous and infamous people
 Sam Bass, Wild West, outlaw
 Charlie Bowdre, Wild West, outlaw/cowboy
 Richard M. Brewer, Wild West, gunslinger/cowboy, outlaw
 Crazy Horse, Native American war leader
 George Armstrong Custer, U. S. Army officer
 Wyatt Earp, Wild West, lawman
 E. B. Farnum, Elected official and one of the first residents of Deadwood, South Dakota
 "Wild Bill" Hickok, Legendary Wild West, lawman, gunfighter, and entertainer
 Doc Holliday, Legendary Wild West, gambler, gunfighter, outlaw, dentist
 Frank James, Wild West, outlaw
 Jesse James, Wild West, outlaw
 Calamity Jane, Frontierswoman and professional scout
 Jack McCall, murderer of "Wild Bill" Hickok
 Henry McCarty a.k.a. William Bonney a.k.a. Billy the Kid, Wild West, outlaw/cowboy
 Alexander McSween, Wild West, figure
 Lawrence Murphy, Wild West, racketeer
 Tom O'Folliard, Wild West, outlaw, best friend of Billy the Kid
 Giovanni Passannante, anarchist, attempted assassin of Umberto I of Italy
 Frank Stilwell, Wild West, outlaw/cowboy
 Al Swearengen, pimp and entertainment entrepreneur who ran the Gem Theater, for 22 years during the late 19th century
 John Tunstall, First man to be killed during the Lincoln County War
 John Younger, Wild West, outlaw
 Jim Younger, Wild West, outlaw
 Cole Younger, Wild West, outlaw

See also

 1870s in sociology
 Gilded Age
 Long Depression
 Second Industrial Revolution

References

Further reading 
 Appleton's Annual Cyclopedia ... for 1870 (1871)
 American  Annual Cyclopedia ... for 1872 (1873)
 Appleton's Annual Cyclopedia ... for 1873 (1879) online edition
 Appleton's Annual Cyclopedia ... for 1875 (1877)
 The American Annual Cyclopedia and Register of Important Events of the Year 1876
 Appleton's Annual Cyclopedia ... for 1877 (1878)

 
1870s decade overviews